Agdapdap Islet is an uninhabited islet in the province of Romblon in the Philippines.  It is geographically part of barangay Guimpingan located east of Romblon Island in the Sibuyan Sea.

See also

 List of islands of the Philippines
 List of islands
 Desert island

References

Islands of Romblon
Uninhabited islands of the Philippines